Chazara bischoffii, the orange hermit, is a butterfly species belonging to the family Nymphalidae. It can be found from Turkey, through Armenia, Iran, Azerbaijan and southern Transcaucasia.

The wingspan is 45–60 mm. The butterflies fly from June to August.

External links
 Satyrinae of the Western Palearctic - Chazara bischoffii
 The Butterflies Monitoring & Photography Society of Turkey 
 The Butterflies of Turkey

Chazara
Butterflies described in 1846
Butterflies of Asia
Butterflies of Europe